My Best Friend's Wedding is an upcoming jukebox musical with a book by Ronald Bass and Jonathan Harvey featuring songs by songwriters Burt Bacharach and Hal David, based on the 1997 film of the same name with screenplay by Bass.

Production 
It was announced that the musical will make its world premiere at the Theatre Royal, Plymouth on 19 September 2020 before touring the UK, however due to the COVID-19 pandemic, the production was delayed by a year to open at the Palace Theatre, Manchester on 20 September 2021 before touring the UK with dates until May 2022. The production was due to star Alexandra Burke as Julianne Potter, directed by Rachel Kavanaugh and produced by Michael Harrison and David Ian.

On 30 June 2021, it was announced that the production was cancelled due to the impact of the COVID-19 pandemic. The producers revealed that they hope to find a way to revisit the show at a later date.

Musical numbers 
The musical was due to feature the hit songs of songwriters Burt Bacharach and Hal David including:

 "I'll Never Fall in Love Again"
 "I Just Don't Know What to Do with Myself"
 "Walk on By"
 "I Say a Little Prayer"
 "What's New Pussycat?"

External links

References 

Musicals based on films
Jukebox musicals